"From the D to the A" is a song by American rapper Tee Grizzley featuring fellow American rapper Lil Yachty, released as a single on March 17, 2017. It was produced by Helluva and called "much hyped" by XXL. The song's title refers to the hometowns of the rappers, with "D" being Detroit (Tee Grizzley's hometown) and "A" being Atlanta (where Lil Yachty is from).

Lyrics
XXL stated that Tee Grizzley and Lil Yachty "trade rhyme schemes" on the track.

Music video
Noisey called its music video "classic" due to the presence of helicopters.

Charts

References

2017 singles
2017 songs
Tee Grizzley songs
Lil Yachty songs
Songs written by Lil Yachty

Songs about Detroit
Songs about Atlantis